The 6th Air Defense Artillery Brigade was the unit under which the United States Army Air Defense Artillery School is organized. The ADA School has been redesignated to the 30th Air Defense Artillery Brigade.  The official motto of the 6h ADA is I Aim With a Sure Blow. The brigade was based at Fort Sill, Oklahoma.

Lineage
The 6th Air Defense Artillery Brigade was designated and assigned to Training and Doctrine Command in 1987. Since then, it has provided institutional training for all air defense soldiers and officers. The 6th Air Defense Brigade cased its colors on 18 May 2012 and has been re-flagged as the 30th Air Defense Artillery Brigade. It still has the same subordinate units and mission.

See also

References

External links
http://sill-www.army.mil/ADASchool/6thBDE/index.html 6th BDE Homepage (US Army)

Training brigades of the United States Army
006
Military units and formations established in 1898
Military units and formations disestablished in 2012